Max Boublil  (born Maximilien Léon Boublil; 17 May 1979) is a French actor of Sephardi Jewish descent, singer and comedian. He has released 2 albums.

Boublil started his career as a comedian in a number of films (Le Bon Fils, Les Gaous, Doo Wop, T.I.C.), in television films and series such as (Sous le Soleil, Navarro, Quai N°1, Hé M'sieur!, Mystère) and a number of advertisements (Crunch, Yoplait, Direct Assurance).

In May 2007, he released the provocative and humorous song "Ce soir... tu vas prendre" online and gained big fame and was invited to appear on "Dating" spot on Le Grand Journal on Canal +. He left in October 2007, to concentrate on his one-man shows between 2007 and 2009 including a long French tour Max prend.... and in the provinces under the title Max prend la route starting January 2008.

He also took part in TV shows such as One Man Sauvage and did comedy in Max les veut toutes, a F2H production broadcast on Comédie! and NRJ 12 and in May and June 2010, in the television reality show Dilemme on W9 where he presented Le Mag de Max. In September 2010, he came with his new show Le one man musical that included songs and sketches.

For his music career, he has released two albums, the debut L'album released on 14 February 2011 and the follow up Le 2ème album in June 2012. He is also well known for his humoristic takes on certain songs and personalities such as in "Ce soir tu vas prendre", "Susan Boyle", "Chanson raciste", "J'aime les moches" and others.

Max Boublil co-written and appeared in the film Les Gamins with Alain Chabat, which was released in April 2013.

Filmography
Film
2003: Les Gaous directed by Igor Sékulic
2004: Les Amateurs directed by Martin Valente
2009: La Folle Histoire d'amour de Simon Eskenazy as David in film directed by Jean-Jacques Zilbermann
2011: Happy Feet 2 as Sven Puissant in film directed by George Miller
2012: La Vérité si je mens! 3 directed by Thomas Gilou
2012: Hold Back directed by Rachid Djaidani
2013: Les gamins directed by Anthony Marciano 
2014: Prêt À tout directed by Nicolas Cuche
2015: Robin des bois, la véritable histoire directed by Anthony Marciano
2015: Le nouveau directed by Rudi Rosenberg
2018: Comme des garçons directed by Julien Hallard
2018: Ma reum directed by Frédéric Quiring
2020: Selfie
2020: J'irai mourir dans les Carpates directed by Antoine de Maximy
2020: Adorables directed by Solange Cicurel

Television
1999: Sous le soleil as Aldo
2000: Navarro as Frank (episode 3 in season 12)
2001: Le Bon Fils by Irène Jouannet as Manuel
2002: Capitaine Lawrence as Marco
2002: La Bataille d'Hernani by Jean-Daniel Verhaeghe
2004: Quai n°1 as Stan
2006: Mademoiselle Joubert as Floréal
2006: Hé M'sieur! - Des yeux pour entendre by Patrick Volson as Matéo Goupil
2007: Mystère as Tom
2011: Le Grand Restaurant II by Gérard Pullicino

Discography
Albums

Charting singles

Other songs (non charting)
2008: "Une larme qui coule"
2010: "Montrez les nous"
2010: "Susan Boyle"
2010: "Chatroulette" (feat. Sophie Favier)
2010: "L'inconnue du Boulevard Bessières"
2010: "Depuis que tu n'es plus là"
2010: "Chanson raciste"
2010: "Clash gentil" (feat. Alibi Montana)
2010: "Joyeux Noël"
2011: "Mon coloc'" (feat. Alban Lenoir)
2011: "Moyen Moyenne" (feat. Luce)
2011: "Bois!"
2011: "En couple"
2011: "Boom Boom Boom"
2012: "Exhibitiodance"
2012: "T'es bonne..."
2012: "J'entends rien!"
2012: "Prête-moi ta meuf"
2012: "Put your sex in the air" (feat. Kévin Razy)
2012: "Addict"
Songs on soundtracks
2011: "J'kiffe ton tugudu" (soundtrack of Titeuf 3D)
2011: "Tous des mythos" (soundtrack of Les Mythos'')

References

External links

 
Official website

1979 births
Living people
French people of Tunisian descent
French male film actors
French male television actors
French comedians
20th-century French male actors
21st-century French male actors
French male screenwriters
French screenwriters
21st-century French singers
21st-century French male singers
21st-century French Sephardi Jews